Ruben Deloso Torres (born September 10, 1941 in Botolan, Zambales) is a politician in the Philippines. He goes by the nom de guerre "Kadre" which he was known as a leftist during martial law period.

Life
Torres was known as a student activist, then a leftist leader during and after martial law.

Under President Corazon Aquino, he served as an undersecretary in the Department of Labor and Employment from 1989 to 1990. Afterwards he was promoted to full secretary, serving from 1990 to 1992. Under the next president, Fidel V. Ramos, he worked as executive secretary (colloquially known as the Little President) from 1995 to 1998. He was instrumental in brokering a peace accord with the Muslim rebels in Mindanao.

He later served as Congressman of the 2nd District of Zambales from 2001 to 2004 in the House of Representatives. He is currently the president of the Trade Union Congress of the Philippines and a columnist at The Manila Times.

Autobiography
Torres was portrayed by Cesar Montano in the 1997 movie Kadre.

References

1941 births
Living people
Filipino Roman Catholics
Executive Secretaries of the Philippines
People from Zambales
Members of the House of Representatives of the Philippines from Zambales
Independent politicians in the Philippines
Ramos administration cabinet members
University of the Philippines alumni